Dopasia buettikoferi, Buettikofer's glass lizard, is a species of lizard of the Anguidae family. It is found in Malaysia and Indonesia.

References

Dopasia
Reptiles described in 1905
Reptiles of Malaysia
Reptiles of Indonesia
Taxa named by Theodorus Willem van Lidth de Jeude
Reptiles of Borneo